Princess Georgine Henriette Marie of Waldeck and Pyrmont (23 May 1857  –  30 April 1882) was the third daughter of George Victor, Prince of Waldeck and Pyrmont and his wife, Princess Helena of Nassau, younger half-sister of Adolphe, Grand Duke of Luxembourg.

Family

Marie was born in Arolsen, then part of the German Principality of Waldeck and Pyrmont.  Her younger brother, Friedrich, was the last reigning prince of Waldeck and Pyrmont.  Two of her younger sisters, Emma and Helena, married her third cousin once removed William III of the Netherlands and Prince Leopold, Duke of Albany (youngest son of Queen Victoria), respectively.

Marriage

On 15 February 1877 at Arolsen, Marie married, Prince William of Württemberg (later King William II of Württemberg).

They had three children:

 Princess Pauline (19 December 1877 - 7 May 1965), married William Frederick, Prince of Wied (1872–1945)
 Prince Ulrich (28 July 1880 - 28 December 1880)
 stillborn daughter (24 April 1882)

Death

Marie died on 30 April 1882 in Stuttgart, from complications resulting from the birth of her third child. William married again in 1886 to Charlotte of Schaumburg-Lippe.

Ancestry

References 
 Sönke Lorenz, Dieter Mertens, Volker Press (Hrsg.): Das Haus Württemberg. Ein biographisches Lexikon. Kohlhammer Verlag, Stuttgart 1997, p. 335
 Hansmartin Decker-Hauff: Frauen im Hause Württemberg DRW-Verlag, Leinfelden-Echterdingen 1997, p. 266

1857 births
1882 deaths
People from Bad Arolsen
People from the Principality of Waldeck and Pyrmont
House of Waldeck and Pyrmont
Princesses of Württemberg
Princesses of Waldeck and Pyrmont
Deaths in childbirth
Burials at Alter Friedhof, Ludwigsburg
Daughters of monarchs